Zarabad County is in Sistan and Baluchestan province, Iran. The capital of the county is the city of Zarabad. At the 2006 census, the county's population (as Zarabad District of Konarak County) was 15,492 in 3,360 households. The following census in 2011 counted 17,527 people in 4,169 households. At the 2016 census, the district's population was 20,197 in 5,063 households. The district was separated from the county to become Zarabad County.

Administrative divisions

The population history and structural changes of Zarabad County's administrative divisions (as Zarabad District of Konarak County) over three consecutive censuses are shown in the following table.

References

Counties of Sistan and Baluchestan Province

fa:شهرستان زرآباد